Eurypteryx is a genus of moths in the family Sphingidae.

Species
Eurypteryx alleni Hogenes & Treadaway, 1993
Eurypteryx bhaga (Moore, 1866)
Eurypteryx dianae Brechlin, 2006
Eurypteryx falcata Gehlen, 1922
Eurypteryx geoffreyi Cadiou & Kitching, 1990
Eurypteryx molucca Felder, 1874
Eurypteryx obtruncata Rothschild & Jordan, 1903
Eurypteryx shelfordi Rothschild & Jordan, 1903

 
Macroglossini
Moth genera
Taxa named by Baron Cajetan von Felder